Teall Nunatak is a large nunatak at the mouth of Reeves Glacier, standing 3 nautical miles (6 km) southeast of Hansen Nunatak in Victoria Land. Discovered by the Discovery expedition, 1901–04, the area was more fully explored by the British Antarctic Expedition, 1907–09, which named this feature for Sir Jethro Justinian Harris Teall, Director of the British Geological Survey and Museum of Practical Geology, London, 1901–13.

Nunataks of Victoria Land
Scott Coast